Sherman High School is a public high school in Sherman, Texas, United States. It is part of the Sherman Independent School District located in central Grayson County and classified as a 5A school by the UIL.  In 2015, the school was rated "Met Standard" by the Texas Education Agency.

Athletics
The Sherman Bearcats compete in these sports - 

Cross Country, Volleyball, Football, Basketball, Powerlifting, Swimming, Soccer, Golf, Track, Tennis, Softball & Baseball 
All of Sherman high school athletics are very poor in comparison to Denison High school

State Titles
Sherman (UIL)
Boys Track - 
1921(1A), 1932(All)

Sherman Douglas (PVIL)

Football - 
1964(PVIL-2A)

State Finalists
Sherman (UIL)
Baseball - 
1964(5A)

Sherman Douglas (PVIL)

Football – 
1965(PVIL-2A)

Rivalry
Sherman High School and neighboring Denison High School have had a long-standing football rivalry dating back to 1901.  Each year, the schools play for "The Battle of the Ax" in which an engraved axe is awarded to the winner.  This is the longest continuous rivalry among all high schools in the state of Texas.

Gallery
Picture of new Sherman High School, Sherman, TX.

Notable alumni
Charlie Johnson (Class of 2002) - NFL offensive lineman - played for Super Bowl XLI champion Indianapolis Colts.
Jimmy Hotz (Class of 1971) - Record Producer, Recording Engineer, Inventor, Author, Musician, Audio Expert and Electronic Music Pioneer. 
Curtis Scott Luper (Class of 1984) is an American college football assistant coach at Auburn University
Hunter Smith (Class of 1995)- NFL punter - played for Super Bowl XLI champion Indianapolis Colts.
Michael Quinn Sullivan (Class of 1988) - Journalist, conservative political activist
Jimmy Turner - NFL player
Kirby Hocutt (Class of 1990) - Athletic Director, Texas Tech University
Pete Spratt (Class of 1990) - Former Fighter, Ultimate Fighting Championships
Kyle Crick (Class of 2011) - Major League Baseball (MLB) player
Chris Gittens (Class of 2012) - MLB player
John A. Hilger (Class of 1926) - United States Air Force brigadier general and participant of the Doolittle Raid during World War II

References

External links

 

Schools in Grayson County, Texas
Public high schools in Texas